The 2002 Georgia Bulldogs football team represented the University of Georgia as a member of the Southeastern Conference (SEC) during the 2002 NCAA Division I-A football season. Led by second-year head coach Mark Richt, the Bulldogs compiled an overall record of 13–1 with a mark of 7–1, winning the SEC's Eastern Division. Georgia won the SEC title for the first time since the 1982 season with a 30–3 win over the Arkansas in the SEC Championship Game. The Bulldogs finished the season with a 26–13 win the Sugar Bowl over the Florida State and earned a No. 3 final ranking in the AP Poll and the Coaches Poll.

Schedule

Game summaries

Auburn

Source: USA Today

Georgia clinches SEC East

Roster

References

Georgia
Georgia Bulldogs football seasons
Southeastern Conference football champion seasons
Sugar Bowl champion seasons
Georgia Bulldogs football